Frederick Joseph Teale was an English-born American politician in the state of Iowa.

Teale, a native of Greenwich born in 1836, left England in 1843 for the United States. By 1859, he had moved to Decatur County, Iowa, where he farmed near Decatur City. During the American Civil War, Teale served in the Union Army. He held the District 12 seat in the Iowa House of Representatives for two terms of two years each, from 1870 to 1874. He then served in the Iowa Senate between 1876 and 1880, first for District 6 until 1878, and thereafter for District 7. Throughout his political career, Teale was affiliated with the Republican Party. Shortly after stepping down from the Iowa General Assembly, Teale moved to Los Angeles, where he spent the final three decades of his life, and died on 20 June 1914, aged 78.

References

1836 births
People from Greenwich
Politicians from Los Angeles
1914 deaths
People of Iowa in the American Civil War
19th-century American politicians
Republican Party Iowa state senators
Republican Party members of the Iowa House of Representatives
People from Decatur County, Iowa
English emigrants to the United States